Wilhelmus Antonius "Willy" van de Kerkhof (born 16 September 1951) is a Dutch former professional footballer who played as a midfielder.

Van de Kerkhof and his twin brother René were squad members of the Dutch national team that made the World Cup final in 1974 and became key players in the team that made the 1978 final. He also played for the Netherlands at the Euro 1980. Overall, van de Kerkhof appeared 63 times for his country, scoring five goals.

He was named by Pelé as one of the top 125 greatest living footballers in March 2004.

Career statistics

Club

Honours 
PSV Eindhoven
Eredivisie: 1974–75, 1975–76, 1977–78, 1985–86, 1986–87, 1987–88
KNVB Cup: 1973–74, 1975–76, 1987–88
European Cup: 1987–88
UEFA Cup: 1977–78

Netherlands
FIFA World Cup runner-up: 1974, 1978
UEFA European Championship third place: 1976

References 

1951 births
Living people
FIFA 100
Dutch footballers
Netherlands international footballers
Eredivisie players
FC Twente players
PSV Eindhoven players
1974 FIFA World Cup players
UEFA Euro 1976 players
1978 FIFA World Cup players
UEFA Euro 1980 players
Dutch twins
Dutch beach soccer players
Sportspeople from Helmond
Footballers from North Brabant
Twin sportspeople
UEFA Cup winning players
Association football midfielders
Identical twins